Anelaphus vernus is a species of beetle in the family Cerambycidae. It was described by Chemsak in 1991.

References

Anelaphus
Beetles described in 1991